Brock Sterling Berlin (born July 4, 1981) is an American former college and professional football player who was a quarterback in the National Football League (NFL).  He played college football for the University of Florida and the University of Miami.  Berlin was signed by the Miami Dolphins of the NFL as an undrafted free agent in 2005, and has also been a member of the Dallas Cowboys, St. Louis Rams, and Detroit Lions.

Early years
Berlin was born in Shreveport, Louisiana, and attended Evangel Christian Academy in Shreveport, where he played quarterback for the football team.  After helping lead Evangel Christian to three consecutive Louisiana state high school football championships, Berlin was one of the most hyped football recruits in history.  He was recognized as a Parade All-American and won numerous personal honors, including being named Gatorade National Player of the Year and USA Today National Offensive Player of the Year.

College career

University of Florida
After a long recruiting battle for his services, Berlin chose to accept an athletic scholarship to attend the University of Florida, where he played for coach Steve Spurrier's Florida Gators football team during the 2000 and 2001 seasons.  His career as a Florida Gator never panned out, though, as he found himself stuck behind Rex Grossman on the team's depth chart.  Given the chance to start the 2002 Orange Bowl because Grossman was benched for violating curfew, Berlin performed adequately.  He engineered two scoring drives out of six opportunities in the first 24 minutes, including one touchdown pass and two interceptions.  Grossman came in late in the first half and played a brilliant game, solidifying his status as the Gators' starting quarterback for the following season.  Berlin played in twelve games for the Gators over two seasons, throwing for 849 yards, 12 touchdowns, and four interceptions while completing 64-of-106 passes (60.4%).

University of Miami
After the 2001 season, Berlin transferred to the University of Miami, where he would have the opportunity to play for the defending national champion Miami Hurricanes.  As required by NCAA transfer regulations, Berlin sat out the 2002 season, which he spent running Miami's scout team.

2003 season
After incumbent quarterback Ken Dorsey's graduation, Berlin took over the starting job for the 2003 season.  Berlin's first season was marked by inconsistency.  In his first home game as a Miami Hurricane, Berlin squared off against his old team, the Florida Gators.  The Hurricanes fell behind 33-10 in the third quarter and Berlin began to hear boos from the crowd as it appeared Miami's then-33 game regular season winning streak was about to end.  Berlin, though,  caught fire as the team switched to a shotgun offense and rallied Miami to 28 unanswered points.  The 38-33 victory was the greatest comeback in Miami history. He also stoked the fires of the Florida–Miami rivalry by mocking his former team and fans during and after the game. Several weeks later, Berlin again showed his mettle in leading Miami to a 22–14 rain soaked victory at rival Florida State. However, Berlin struggled in a 31–7 November 1 loss to the Virginia Tech Hokies, as Miami's regular season winning streak was snapped at 39 games. Berlin and the Miami offense again struggled the next week as a hungover Hurricane squad lost 10-6 to Tennessee at home.  Berlin, under intense criticism by the media and fans, was benched by head coach Larry Coker for Miami's next game against Syracuse.  After Miami's offense, now quarterbacked by Derrick Crudup, again struggled in the 17-10 homecoming win against Syracuse, Coker switched back to Berlin. Miami would win the Big East Conference, defeat Florida State (for the second time that season) in the FedEx Orange Bowl, and finish the season at 11–2 and ranked #5 in both polls.  Despite showing poise and strong leadership skills, Berlin's numbers for the 2003 season (2,419 yards, 12 touchdowns, and 17 interceptions) were unimpressive, and Coker opened up competition for the quarterback job in the spring.

2004 season
Despite some fans clamoring for highly touted redshirt freshman Kyle Wright to be given the job, Berlin, now a senior, showed considerable progress during spring practice and won the starting job decisively.

Berlin played much better during the 2004 season and added yet another historic comeback to his résumé when he led Miami to a 41–38 win over Louisville in which Miami rallied from a 17-point deficit in the final 20 minutes of the game.  The Hurricanes would rise as high as #4 in the rankings before late season losses to ACC foes North Carolina, Clemson, and Virginia Tech knocked Miami out of national and conference championship contention.  One highlight came against Wake Forest in the next-to-last regular season game of the year when Berlin tied a school record with 5 touchdown passes. After an 8–3 regular season, Miami was invited to play in the Peach Bowl, where Berlin once again faced his former team, the Florida Gators.  Again, Berlin enjoyed success against his former school as Miami won 27–10, finishing the season 9–3 and ranked #11 in both polls.

Berlin finished the season with impressive numbers, throwing for 2,961 yards and 25 touchdowns with only six interceptions.  Berlin was also named All-ACC (Second-team), and finished second in both ACC Player of the Year and ACC Offensive Player of the Year voting behind Virginia Tech quarterback Bryan Randall.

Berlin threw for 7,364 yards and 42 touchdowns during his Miami career and finished with a 19–5 record as the team's starting quarterback.  He is remembered for his toughness and leadership and for going a combined 5–0 against Miami's archrivals, Florida (2–0) and Florida State (3-0).

Berlin earned a bachelor's degree in sociology at the University of Miami.

Professional career

Miami Dolphins
Berlin went undrafted in the 2005 NFL Draft, but was soon signed to a free agent contract by the Miami Dolphins. He served as a backup quarterback for the Dolphins during training camp, although he was not a member of the team's active regular season roster. During the offseason, Berlin was allocated by the Dolphins to NFL Europe to the Hamburg Sea Devils.

He played sparingly in the Dolphins' pre-season games in 2006, completing 6-of-12 passes for 104 yards and a touchdown. He was cut by the team on August 30, 2006.

Dallas Cowboys
On April 25, 2007, he signed with the Dallas Cowboys to compete to be their third-string quarterback. On May 10, 2007, he was released by the team.

St. Louis Rams
On May 17, 2007, the St. Louis Rams signed Berlin to a contract. Berlin started his first NFL regular-season game on December 9, 2007. He was 17-for-27 for 153 yards and an interception in the 19-10 loss to the Cincinnati Bengals. 

In 2008, Berlin served as the Rams' inactive third quarterback for 15 games; he only saw action in the game against the Chicago Bears. He was released by the Rams on September 5, 2009.

Detroit Lions
Berlin was signed to the Detroit Lions practice squad on September 7, 2009. He was released by the team on September 23.

After his release from the Lions, Berlin did not sign with another NFL team.

Family
Berlin is married to wife Amy; the couple has one daughter, Gracie.

References

External links
 Florida profile

1981 births
Living people
American football quarterbacks
Dallas Cowboys players
Detroit Lions players
Florida Gators football players
Hamburg Sea Devils players
Miami Dolphins players
Miami Hurricanes football players
St. Louis Rams players
Evangel Christian Academy alumni
Players of American football from Shreveport, Louisiana